Dhan Bahadur Biswa is a Bhutanese international footballer. He made his first appearance in their final 2018 World Cup qualifying match against the Maldives, coming on as a substitute in the 87th minute.

References

Bhutanese footballers
Bhutan international footballers
Living people
Association football forwards
1994 births
Bhutanese people of Nepalese descent